Paul Brummell  (born 28 August 1965) is a British diplomat and travel writer.

Early life
Brummell was educated at St Albans School before reading geography at St Catharine's College, Cambridge. He entered the Foreign and Commonwealth Office in 1987.

Career

After stints in Pakistan, Italy, and in Whitehall, Brummell received his first posting as head of a diplomatic mission in 2002, as Ambassador to Turkmenistan. In 2005, he made the relatively short move to head the embassy in Kazakhstan, a position that also includes being non-resident ambassador to Kyrgyzstan. That same year his name was among a list of individuals claimed to be serving members of the Secret Intelligence Service that appeared on the US website Cryptome.

In 2008 he invited the US ambassador, Tatiana Gfoeller, to a meeting with the Duke of York and British businessmen; her report to Washington, leaked by WikiLeaks and reported by British and international media, mentioned indiscreet remarks by the Duke.

In 2009 Brummell was transferred to Bridgetown, Barbados, where he served as High Commissioner to Barbados and the Eastern Caribbean (Antigua and Barbuda, Dominica, Grenada, St Kitts and Nevis, St Lucia, and St Vincent and the Grenadines) until 2013, and was also UK representative to CARICOM and the OECS.

Following this, Brummell served as Ambassador to Romania from 2014 to 2018.

He currently holds the position of Head of Soft Power and External Affairs Department within the Communication Directorate of the Foreign and Commonwealth Office.

Brummell was appointed Companion of the Order of St Michael and St George (CMG) in the 2016 Birthday Honours for services to foreign policy.

In July 2021 he succeeded Keith Shannon as Ambassador to Latvia.

Publications
Turkmenistan, Bradt Travel Guides, 2005. 
Kazakhstan, Bradt Travel Guides, 2008.

References
BRUMMELL, Paul, Who's Who 2014, A & C Black, 2014; online edn, Oxford University Press, 2014

External links
Paul Brummell, gov.uk

1965 births
Living people
People educated at St Albans School, Hertfordshire
Alumni of St Catharine's College, Cambridge
Members of HM Diplomatic Service
Ambassadors of the United Kingdom to Kazakhstan
Ambassadors of the United Kingdom to Kyrgyzstan
Ambassadors of the United Kingdom to Turkmenistan
High Commissioners of the United Kingdom to Barbados
High Commissioners of the United Kingdom to Antigua and Barbuda
High Commissioners of the United Kingdom to Dominica
High Commissioners of the United Kingdom to Grenada
High Commissioners of the United Kingdom to Saint Kitts and Nevis
High Commissioners of the United Kingdom to Saint Lucia
High Commissioners of the United Kingdom to Saint Vincent and the Grenadines
Ambassadors of the United Kingdom to Romania
Ambassadors of the United Kingdom to Latvia
British travel writers
Companions of the Order of St Michael and St George
20th-century British diplomats